"Tu Olor" (English: "Your Scent") is the second single by Wisin & Yandel's album Los Vaqueros: El Regreso. A music video was filmed and released. It received and award for "Urban Song of the Year" at the 2012 ASCAP Awards, which are awarded annually by the American Society of Composers, Authors and Publishers in the United States.

Music video
The music video is set in Cartagena de Indias, Colombia as shown in intro credits. Video starts with a woman swimming into a pool and then it shows Wisin & Yandel in a bullring. Video then centers around a car chase.

Charts

Weekly charts

Year-end charts

References

2011 songs
Wisin & Yandel songs
Spanglish songs
Machete Music singles
Songs written by Nesty (producer)